The final and the qualifying heats of the men's 4×100 metre freestyle relay event at the 1998 World Aquatics Championships were held on Thursday 1998-01-15 in Perth, Western Australia.

Final

Qualifying heats

Heat 1

Heat 2

See also
1996 Men's Olympic Games 4x100m Freestyle (Atlanta)
1997 Men's World Championships (SC) 4x100m Freestyle (Gothenburg)
1997 Men's European Championships (LC) 4x100m Freestyle (Seville)
2000 Men's Olympic Games 4x100m Freestyle (Sydney)

References

Swimming at the 1998 World Aquatics Championships